The Stade Jos Nosbaum is a football stadium in Dudelange, in southern Luxembourg.  It is currently the home stadium of F91 Dudelange.  Until 1991, it was the home of US Dudelange. The stadium has a capacity of 2,558.

References

Pictures at europlan-online.de
World Stadiums – Luxembourg

Football venues in Luxembourg
Sports venues in Dudelange
F91 Dudelange